was the 95th emperor of Japan, according to the traditional order of succession.  His reign spanned the years from 1308 through 1318.

Genealogy
Before his ascension to the Chrysanthemum Throne, his personal name (his imina) was Tomihito-shinnō (富仁親王).

He was the fourth son of the 92nd Emperor, Fushimi.  He belonged to the Jimyōin-tō branch of the Imperial Family.

Consort: Ogimachi Michiko (正親町実子) later Senkomon’in (宣光門院, 1297–1360), Ogimachi Saneakira’s daughter
 First Daughter: Imperial Princess Hisako (1318–1358; 寿子内親王) later Kianmon-in (徽安門院), married Emperor Kogon
 Second Son: Imperial Prince Nobunaga (業永親王; 1327–1353) later Imperial Prince priest Genshi (源性入道親王)
 Third son: Imperial Prince Naohito (直仁親王; 1335–1398)
 Daughter: Imperial Princess Noriko (儀子内親王; d. 1348)
 Priest Shōgoin
 Daughter married to Kazan’in clan

Consort: Ichijo-no-Tsubone (d. 1325), Ogimachi Saneakira’s daughter
 First Son: Imperial Prince Priest Kakuyo (1320–1382; 覚誉法親王)

Lady-in-waiting: Wamuro Yoriko (葉室頼子), Wamuro Yorito’s daughter
 Fifth Daughter: Imperial Princess Noriko (祝子内親王) – Nun
 Princess

Events of Hanazono's life
Tomihito-shinnō became emperor upon the death of his second cousin, the Daikakuji-tō Emperor Go-Nijō.
 Tokuji 3, in the 8th month (1308): In the 8th year of Go-Nijo-tennō'''s reign (後二条天皇八年), the emperor died at the young age of 24; and the succession (senso) was received by his cousin.  Shortly thereafter, Emperor Hanazono is said to have acceded to the throne (sokui).
 Tokuji 3, in the 10th month (1308): The nengō was changed to Enkyō to mark the accession of Emperor Hanazono.

Hanazono's father, the retired-Emperor Fushimi, and Hanazono's brother, the retired-Emperor Go-Fushimi, both exerted influence as cloistered emperors during this reign.

In these years, negotiations between the Bakufu and the two imperial lines resulted in an agreement to alternate the throne between the two lines every 10 years (the Bumpō Agreement).  This agreement was not long-lasting.  The negotiated provisions would soon broken by Hanazono's successor.

In 1318, he abdicated to his second cousin, the Daikakuji-tō Emperor Go-Daigo, who was Nijō's brother.

After his abdication, he raised his nephew, the future Northern Pretender Emperor Kōgon.

In 1335, he became a Buddhist monk of the Zen sect, and under his sponsorship, his palace became the temple of Myōshin-ji, now the largest network in Rinzai Buddhism. Many places and institutions in the area are named for him, including Hanazono University (the Rinzai university) and Hanazono Station.

He died in 1348.  Hanazono's imperial tomb is known as Jurakuin no ue no misasagi; it is located in Higashiyama-ku, Kyoto.

He excelled at waka composition, and was an important member of the Kyōgoku School.  He also left behind a diary, called Hanazono-in-Minki (Imperial Chronicles of the Flower Garden Temple or Hanazono-in) (花園院宸記).  He was a very religious and literate person, never missing his prayers to the Amitabha Buddha.

Kugyō
 is a collective term for the very few most powerful men attached to the court of the Emperor of Japan in pre-Meiji eras. Even during those years in which the court's actual influence outside the palace walls was minimal, the hierarchic organization persisted.

In general, this elite group included only three to four men at a time.  These were hereditary courtiers whose experience and background would have brought them to the pinnacle of a life's career.  During Hanazono's reign, this apex of the Daijō-kan included:
 Sesshō, Kujō Moronori, 1308
 Sesshō, Takatsukasa Fuyuhira, 1308–1311
 Kampaku, Takatsukasa Fuyuhira, 1311–1313
 Kampaku, Konoe Iehira, 1313–1315
 Kampaku, Takatsukasa Fuyuhira, 1315–1316
 Kampaku, Nijō Michihira, 1316–1318
 Sadaijin Udaijin Nadaijin DainagonEras of Hanazono's reign
The years of Hanazono's reign are more specifically identified by more than one era name or nengō.
 Tokuji               (1306–1308)
 Enkyō                (1308–1311)
 Ōchō            (1311–1312)
 Shōwa  (1312–1317)
 Bumpō                (1317–1319)

Notes

References
 Ponsonby-Fane, Richard Arthur Brabazon. (1959).  The Imperial House of Japan. Kyoto: Ponsonby Memorial Society. OCLC 194887
 Titsingh, Isaac. (1834). Nihon Ōdai Ichiran''; ou,  Annales des empereurs du Japon.  Paris: Royal Asiatic Society, Oriental Translation Fund of Great Britain and Ireland. OCLC 5850691
 Varley, H. Paul. (1980). Jinnō Shōtōki: A Chronicle of Gods and Sovereigns. New York: Columbia University Press. ; OCLC 59145842

See also
 Emperor of Japan
 List of Emperors of Japan
 Imperial cult
 Emperor Go-Hanazono

Japanese emperors
1297 births
1348 deaths
Emperor Hanazono
Emperor Hanazono
Emperor Hanazono
13th-century Japanese people
14th-century Japanese monarchs
Japanese diarists
Muromachi period Buddhist clergy
Zen Buddhist monks
Japanese Zen Buddhists
Waka poets
Japanese retired emperors